Craig D. Wills is a retired United States Air Force major general who served as the commander of the Nineteenth Air Force from 2019 to 2022. He previously served as the Deputy Chief of the Office of Security Cooperation – Iraq.

References

External links

Year of birth missing (living people)
Living people
Place of birth missing (living people)
United States Air Force generals